The men's 400 metres event at the 2000 Summer Olympics as part of the athletics programme was held at Stadium Australia from 22 to 25 September 2000. Sixty-eight athletes from 44 nations competed. The maximum number of athletes per nation had been set at 3 since the 1930 Olympic Congress. The event was won by Michael Johnson of the United States, successfully defending his 1996 gold medal (the only man to do so in the history of the Olympic 400 metres race). It was the fifth in what would ultimately be 7 consecutive American victories stretching from 1984 to 2008 and the 17th overall title in the event by the United States. Gregory Haughton's bronze was Jamaica's first medal in the event since the nation won back-to-back golds in 1948 and 1952.

Background

This was the 24th appearance of the event, which is one of 12 athletics events to have been held at every Summer Olympics. Five of the finalists from 1996 returned. Defending gold medalist Michael Johnson and fourth-place finisher Alvin Harrison of the United States, bronze medalist Davis Kamoga of Uganda, seventh-place finisher Davian Clarke of Jamaica, and eight-place Ibrahim Ismail Muftah of Qatar. Johnson had stretched his world championship streak to 4, set a new world record, and was the (overwhelming) favorite again in 2000. Both of the other medalists (Sanderlei Parrela of Brazil and Alejandro Cárdenas of Mexico) from the 1999 worlds were in Sydney as well.

Following the breakup of the Soviet Union, Lithuania and Ukraine appeared in this event for the first time. Russia appeared for the first time since 1912. The United States made its 23rd appearance, most of any nation, having missed only the boycotted 1980 Summer Olympics in Moscow.

Qualification

Each National Olympic Committee was permitted to enter up to three athletes that had run 45.80 seconds or faster during the qualification period. The maximum number of athletes per nation had been set at 3 since the 1930 Olympic Congress. If an NOC had no athletes that qualified under that standard, one athlete that had run 46.20 seconds or faster could be entered.

Competition format

The competition retained the basic four-round format from 1920. The "fastest loser" system, introduced in 1964, was used for the first round. There were 9 first-round heats, each with 7 or 8 runners. The top three runners in each heat advanced, along with the next five fastest overall. The 32 quarterfinalists were divided into 4 quarterfinals with 8 runners each; the top four athletes in each quarterfinal heat advanced to the semifinals, with no "fastest loser" spots. The semifinals featured 2 heats of 8 runners each. The top four runners in each semifinal heat advanced, making an eight-man final.

Records

These were the standing world and Olympic records (in seconds) prior to the 2000 Summer Olympics.

No world or Olympic records were set in this event.

The following national records were established during the competition:

Schedule

Following the 1984 schedule, the event was held on four separate days, with each round being on a different day.

All times are Australian Eastern Standard Time (UTC+10)

Results 

All times shown are in seconds.

Round 1

Heat 1

Heat 2

Heat 3

Heat 4

Heat 5

Heat 6

Heat 7

Heat 8

Heat 9

Overall results for Round 1

Quarterfinals

Quarterfinal 1

Quarterfinal 2

Quarterfinal 3

Quarterfinal 4

Overall results for quarterfinals

Semifinals

Semifinal 1

Semifinal 2

Overall results for semifinals

Final

References

External links
Source: Official Report of the 2000 Sydney Summer Olympics available at  https://web.archive.org/web/20080522105330/http://www.la84foundation.org/5va/reports_frmst.htm

Athletics at the 2000 Summer Olympics
400 metres at the Olympics
Men's events at the 2000 Summer Olympics